Karnali Highway (also referred to as H13) is a highway, and is a vital transport link between two regions in Nepal. This highway links the towns of Jumla with the Karnali capital Birendranagar and rest parts of  Surkhet district.  Karnali Province is the largest, remotest and the least developed province in Nepal.  Of its  length,  were blacktopped in 2010, previously the unfinished highway journey was featured in a documentary The Karnali Express: Bumping on for 52 Hours   Due to heavy monsoon rains in 2010, the Karnali Highway was closed due to landslides from heavy monsoon rains, crops were destroyed by incessant rain, and 1/3 of the entire country was inaccessible except by foot.  It was finally reopened October 3, three months later, but not until after starvation deaths.

According to  “A Value Chain Analysis of Apple from Jumla”, and the intervention strategy indicates that more than 85 percent of the Karnali highway is still unsafe .  Many rural inhabitants along the highway have poor access to markets, healthcare facilities and schools and deal with high transport costs.  Inadequate roads make it hard for farmers to transport and market their crops. There is a pressing need to provide a functional road system in the area, made more urgent by current concerns over food prices and shortages, high energy costs and social and health needs   Between 60 and 75 percent of children under five are chronically malnourished, and up to 64 percent of the population live in poverty.

References

External links
 Food Distribution and Health Camp in Jumla

Highways in Nepal